Maurizio Migliavacca (born 5 April 1951 in Fiorenzuola d'Arda) is an Italian politician and the current Coordinator of the Democratic Party, the main center-left political party in Italy. He has been a member of the Italian Chamber of Deputies from 1996 to 2001 and since 2006.

Biography
Maurizio Migliavacca was born in Fiorenzuola d'Arda is a comune in the Arda valley, in the Province of Piacenza, Emilia-Romagna region, Italy.
He is graduated in Political science and from 1990 to 1994 he was President of the Province of Piacenza.
In 1996 Migliavacca was elected in the Italian Chamber of Deputies for Emilia-Romagna with the Democratic Party of the Left.
In 2001 elections Migliavacca was not re-elected at the Chamber of Deputies, but after five years, in 2006 elections he returned at the Chamber of Deputies with The Union led by Romano Prodi.
Migliavacca was re-elected after two years in the 2008 elections.
On 24 November 2009 he was nominated Coordinator of the Democratic Party.

References

1951 births
Article One (political party) politicians
Democratic Party (Italy) politicians
Democratic Party of the Left politicians
Democrats of the Left MEPs
Italian Communist Party politicians
20th-century Italian politicians
Living people
MEPs for Italy 2004–2009
21st-century Italian politicians
People from the Province of Piacenza
Presidents of the Province of Piacenza